Tancoco is a municipality located in the north zone in the State of Veracruz, about 210 km from state capital Xalapa. It has a surface of 145.59 km2. On the occasion of the development reached by the camp petroleum of Zacamixtle, the municipal head-board was moved to this place. For Decree of December 26, 1929 it returns to the village of Tancoco, its category of Municipality.

Geographic limits

The municipality of Tancoco is delimited to the north by Tamalín and Naranjos Amatlán, to the east by Tamiahua, to the south by Cerro Azul and Tepetzintla, to the west by Chontla. It is watered by small creeks, which end in Tamiahua's lagoon.

Agriculture

It produces principally maize, beans and orange fruit.

Celebrations

In Tancoco, in February takes place the celebration in honor to Virgen de la Candelaria, Patron of the town, and in December takes place the celebration in honor to Virgen de Guadalupe.

Weather

The weather in Tancoco is warm and wet all year with rains in summer and autumn.

References

External links 

  Municipal Official webpage
  Municipal Official Information

Municipalities of Veracruz